The Dacia Nova is a subcompact/supermini car manufactured by Romanian auto maker Dacia from 1995 to 2000.

History

The Dacia Nova was the first in-house developed Dacia model and it was intended to complement the Renault 12-based "Berlina" (Sedan) and "Break" (Estate) range, with a small liftback/fastback. Work for this model had started in the 1980s, this being the reason why the car looked outdated from the time it first left the factory, in 1995. The next year, the more modern-looking and more popular, facelifted version was introduced. 

The liftback/fastback body housed a transversely mounted, front-engined, front-wheel-drive layout, offering five doors and five seats. The engine was the old Cléon-based unit from the rest of the Dacia range, although the 1.6l GT version was fuel injected with a Bosch MonoMotronic in 1998 (hence GTi). The GT version was fueled by a double-barrelled Carfil carburettor, sourced from the Oltcit supermini, which offered very good performance but at the expense of a rather high fuel consumption. 

The Dacia Nova was appreciated for its good road manners, light weight and strong engine.

Although more modern in every way than the classic Dacia range, bodywork quality was generally worse, there was less boot space and the Nova was more expensive. All these combined ensured that the Nova was never a bestseller in the Dacia family and not many examples survive today. It was replaced by the SuperNova in the year 2000.

Engines

See also
Dacia SuperNova
Dacia Solenza

References

External links

Dacia Nova at AutomobileRomanesti.ro

Nova
Cars of Romania
Front-wheel-drive vehicles
Subcompact cars
Euro NCAP superminis
Hatchbacks
2000s cars
Cars introduced in 1995